Karpno may refer to the following places:
Karpno, Bytów County in Pomeranian Voivodeship (north Poland)
Karpno, Słupsk County in Pomeranian Voivodeship (north Poland)
Karpno, Drawsko County in West Pomeranian Voivodeship (north-west Poland)
Karpno, Świdwin County in West Pomeranian Voivodeship (north-west Poland)